Phil(l)ip Car(e)y may refer to:

Philip Cary (MP, died 1631) of Woodstock, member of House of Commons between 1614 and 1625
Philip Cary (MP, died 1437) of Cockington, Devon, Member of Parliament for Devon in 1433
Philip Cary (officer of arms) (1895–1968)
Phillip Cary (born 1958), philosophy professor
Philip Carey (1925–2009), American actor
Philip J. Carey, American judge and politician